Beginnings: The Lost Tapes 1988–1991 is a posthumous album by American rapper 2Pac, released on June 12, 2007 by Koch Records. The album was originally released on April 18, 2000, in bootleg form under the title The Lost Tapes: Circa 1989, but the selling was quickly halted due to copyright infringement.

Produced by Digital Underground and Strictly Dope member Chopmaster J, Beginnings... is a collection of the rapper's earliest songs, created before Shakur began working on his first studio album, 2Pacalypse Now.

Background 

The songs featured on Beginnings... were originally created by Tupac Shakur and his early crew, Strictly Dope, between 1988 and 1991. While these songs led to 2Pac joining a concert tour with Digital Underground as a roadie for Chopmaster J and a dancer and crew member for Digital Underground, most of them were not heard by the general public (with the exception of "Panther Power", "The Case of the Misplaced Mic" and "Static").

In the year 2000, Chopmaster J rediscovered the recordings in his mother's basement and released them as an album on April 18, 2000, under the title The Lost Tapes: Circa 1989. However, the selling was soon stopped by 2Pac's mother, Afeni Shakur, due to copyright infringement. In 2007, the same songs were re-released with Afeni Shakur's approval, as Beginnings: The Lost Tapes 1988–1991.

Critical reception 

CD Universe noted that Shakur's "flow and lyrical content are more reminiscent of late-1980s/early-1990s icons like Big Daddy Kane and Rakim" than of the later songs of 2Pac himself. Jason Birchmeier of Allmusic agreed that the rapper sounds "inspired here, no doubt, but nonetheless a bit clumsy and imitative". Birchmeier also commented that "there's little more here than skeletal drum machine beats for production". It also seems much of the political content of the songs has been overlooked.

Track listing

References

External links 
 2Pac Legacy (Official website)
 Tupac Amaru Shakur Foundation for the Arts

Compilation albums published posthumously
2007 compilation albums
Tupac Shakur compilation albums